Malikzada Manzoor Ahmad (born Malikzada Manzuur Ahmad; 17 October 1929  22 April 2016) was an Indian Urdu poet, composer, compere, educationist and humorist. Primarily known for compering mushairas in India and abroad and contributing to Urdu literature, he also compered the DCM mushaira, IndiaPakistan poetry conference from 1952 to 2016. He also compered the IndiaPakistan mushaira in Ambala and in the Red Fort (Lal Qila).

Biography 
He was born as Malikzada Manzuur Ahmad in Ambedkar Nagar, Uttar Pradesh. As a writer, he wrote novels, poetry and prose such as College Girl (1954 novel), Urdu Ka Mas’laa (1957 monograph), Shahr-e-Sukhan (1961 poetry), and Raqs-e-Sharar'' (2004 autobiography).

He also wrote numerous uncertain books such as autobiography and poetry, however his work was focused on research by scholarly topics related to Urdu poetry. He was awarded three PhD degrees by Jammu University, Nagpur University and Gorakhpur University. He was later awarded an MPhil degree by an uncertain university.

He served at various universities such as lecturer of history in Mahrajganj, Azamgarh, lecturer of English in Azamgarh and lecturer of Urdu in Gorakhpur University. He retired as professor of Urdu from Lucknow University.

He served as a president of Urdu Academy, Uttar Pradesh, chairman of government of Uttar Pradesh's Fakhruddin Ali Ahmad Memorial Committee, member executive council for the National Council for Promotion of Urdu Language besides serving as the member of Prasar Bharati and member executive council for Lucknow University among others.

He was the recipient of eighty uncertain awards in recognition of his contribution to Urdu literature.

Death 
He was suffering from cardiovascular disease and was admitted to a private hospital two days before he died on 22 Apr 2016 in Lucknow.

References

Further reading 
 

1929 births
2016 deaths
Poets from Uttar Pradesh
20th-century Indian poets
Urdu-language poets from India
People from Azamgarh